The Aspidoceratinae is a subfamily in the perisphictacean ammonite family, Aspidoceratidae found world wide in middle and upper Jurassic sediments.

Aspidoceratinae differ from  Peltoceratinae in that the early biplicate ribbed stage is lacking, or greatly reduced, and no forms with lappets are known. Aptycus are bivalved and very durable, and in the "lower Kimmeridgian form Aptychus beds, containing few or no ammonites". (Kimmeridgian is middle Upper Jurassic, follows the Oxfordian  and predates the Tithonian).

The earliest Aspidoceratinae occur with the first Peltoceratinae, and likewise are probably derived from within the Perisphinctidae

References
Notes

Bibliography
 Arkell, et al., 1957. Mesozoic Ammonoidea. Treatise on Invertebrate Paleontology, Part L (Ammonoidea). Geol Soc of America and Univ Kansas Press.

Jurassic ammonites
Aspidoceratidae